The Summit League men's soccer tournament is the conference championship tournament in soccer for the Summit League.  The tournament has been held every year since 1994.  It is a single-elimination tournament and seeding is based on regular season records. The winner, declared conference champion, receives the conference's automatic bid to the NCAA Division I men's soccer championship.

Champions

Key

Finals

Performance by school

Italics indicate a school that is no longer a conference member

† No longer sponsor men's soccer

References

External links